Agyneta arida is a species of sheet weaver found in the Galapagos Islands. It was described by Baert in 1990.

References

arida
Endemic fauna of the Galápagos Islands
Spiders of South America
Spiders described in 1990